The 1986-87 NBA season was the Kings' 38th season in the NBA and second in Sacramento.

Draft picks

Roster

Regular season

Season standings

z - clinched division title
y - clinched division title
x - clinched playoff spot

Record vs. opponents

Game log

Player statistics

Awards and records

Transactions

References

See also
 1986-87 NBA season

Sacramento Kings seasons
Sacramento
Sacramento
Sacramento